Zeuner  is a surname. Notable people with the surname include:

Charles Zeuner (1795–1857), American organist and composer
Frederick Everard Zeuner (1905–1963), German palaeontologist and geological archaeologist
Gustav Zeuner (1828–1907), German physicist, engineer and epistemologist
Jonas Zeuner (1727–1814), German artist and engraver
Reg Zeuner (born 1928), Australian rules footballer